The Cahuilla Mountain Wilderness is a federally designated wilderness area located  in Riverside County in Southern California. The  wilderness is managed by the United States Forest Service in the San Bernardino National Forest.  
The summit of Cahuilla Mountain sits at 5604 feet (1708 m) and provides an excellent view of the nearby Juan Bautista de Anza National Historic Trail. A trail to the top winds through the chaparral, as well as groves of live oak and Jeffrey pine. Local wildlife include mountain lion, mountain and California quail, and the rare red diamond rattlesnake.

See also
Cahuilla Band of Mission Indians of the Cahuilla Reservation
List of U.S. Wilderness Areas

References

San Bernardino National Forest
Protected areas of Riverside County, California
Wilderness areas of California